San Joaquín is a village in the Corozal District of Belize. With a population of about 2000 people, it is one of the largest villages in Corozal. The town was formed as a result of Mestizos migrating to escape the 1847–1901 Caste War of Yucatán.

References

Populated places in Corozal District
Corozal South East
Mestizo communities in Belize